The common garter snake (Thamnophis sirtalis) is a species of snake in the subfamily Natricinae of the family Colubridae. The species is indigenous to North America and found widely across the continent. There are several recognized subspecies. The common garter snake is the state reptile of Massachusetts.

Description
Common garter snakes are thin snakes. Most have longitudinal stripes in many different colors. Common garter snakes come in a wide range of colors, including green, blue, yellow, gold, red, orange, brown, and black.

Life history
The common garter snake is a diurnal snake. In summer, it is most active in the morning and late afternoon; in cooler seasons or climates, it restricts its activity to the warm afternoons.

In warmer southern areas, the snake is active year-round; otherwise, it sleeps in common dens, sometimes in great numbers. On warm winter afternoons, some snakes have been observed emerging from their hibernacula to bask in the sun.

Venom
 
The saliva of a common garter snake may be toxic to amphibians and other small animals. Garter snakes have a mild venom in their saliva. For humans, a bite is not dangerous, though it may cause slight itching, burning, and/or swelling. Common garter snakes may also secrete a foul-smelling fluid from postanal glands when handled or harmed.

Common garter snakes are resistant to naturally found poisons such as that of the American toad and rough-skinned newt, the latter of which can kill a human if ingested. They have the ability to absorb the toxin from the newts into their bodies, making them poisonous, which can deter potential predators.

The common garter snake uses toxicity for both offense and defense. On the offensive side, the snake's venom can be toxic to some of its smaller prey, such as mice and other rodents. On the defensive side, the snake uses its resistance to toxicity to provide an important antipredator capability. A study on the evolutionary development of resistance of tetrodotoxin compared two populations of Thamnophis and then tested inside a population of T. sirtalis. Those that were exposed to and lived in the same environment as the newts (Taricha granulosa) or rough-skinned newt, that produce tetrodotoxin when eaten were more immune to the toxin (see figure).It seems that the two species were in a evolutionary arms race.

While resistance to tetrodotoxin is beneficial in acquiring newt prey, costs are associated with it as well. Consuming the toxin can lead to reduced speed and sometimes no movement for extended periods of time, along with impaired thermoregulation. The antipredator display that this species uses demonstrates the idea of an "arms race" between different species and their antipredator displays. Along the entire geographical interaction of T. granulosa and T. sirtalis, patches occur that correspond to strong coevolution, as well as weak or absent coevolution. Populations of T. sirtalis that do not live in areas that contain T. granulosa contain the lowest levels of tetrodotoxin resistance, while those that do live in the same area have the highest levels of tetrodotoxin resistance. In populations where tetrodotoxin is absent in T. granulosa, resistance in T. sirtalis is selected against because the mutation causes lower average population fitness. This helps maintain polymorphism within garter snake populations.

Subspecies
Current scientific classification recognizes 13 subspecies (ordered by date):

A trinomial authority in parentheses indicates that the subspecies was originally described in a genus other than Thamnophis.

Etymology
The subspecific name fitchi is in honor of the American herpetologist Henry Sheldon Fitch.

The subspecific name lowei is in honor of the American herpetologist Charles Herbert Lowe.

The subspecific name pickeringii is in honor of the American naturalist Charles E. Pickering.

Reproduction
Generally, populations include far more males than females, so during mating season, they form "mating balls", in which one or two females are completely swamped by ten or more males. Sometimes a male snake mates with a female before hibernation, and the female stores the sperm internally until spring, when she allows her eggs to be fertilized. If she mates again in the spring, the fall sperm degenerate and the spring sperm fertilize her eggs. The females may give birth ovoviviparously to 12 to 40 young from July through October.

In the early part of sex, when snakes are coming out of hibernation, the males generally emerge first to be ready when the females wake up. Some males assume the role of a female and lead other males away from the burrow, luring them with a fake female pheromone. After such a male has led rivals away, he "turns" back into a male and races back to the den, just as the females emerge. He is then the first to mate with all the females he can catch. This method also serves to help warm males by tricking other males into surrounding and heating up the male, and is particularly useful to subspecies in colder climates (such as those inhabited by T. s. parietalis); this type of mimicry is primarily found in that subspecies. These deceptive males have been found to mate with females significantly more often than males that do not exhibit this mimicry.

Habitat
The habitat of the common garter snake ranges from forests, fields, and prairies to streams, wetlands, meadows, marshes, and ponds, and it is often found near water. Depending on the subspecies, the common garter snake can be found as far south the southernmost tip of Florida in the United States and as far north as the southernmost tip of the Northwest Territories in Canada. It is found at altitudes from sea level to mountains.

Diet
The diet of T. sirtalis consists mainly of amphibians and earthworms, but also leeches, slugs, snails, insects, crayfish, fish, lizards, other snakes, small birds, and rodents. Common garter snakes are effective at catching fast-moving creatures such as fish and tadpoles.

As prey
Animals that prey on the common garter snake include large fish (such as bass and catfish), American bullfrogs, common snapping turtles, larger snakes, hawks, raccoons, foxes, wild turkeys, and domestic cats and dogs.

Conservation
Water contamination, urban expansion, and residential and industrial development are all threats to the common garter snake. The San Francisco garter snake (T. s. tetrataenia), which is extremely scarce and occurs only in the vicinity of ponds and reservoirs in San Mateo County, California, has been listed as an endangered species by the U.S. Fish and Wildlife Service since 1967.

Antipredatory displays
Garter snakes exhibit many different behaviors to ward off predators. Garter snakes exhibit a greater variety of body postures than other snakes. Under selection by predation, these snakes have developed postural responses that are highly variable and heritable. These are highly variable even within a single population. Different postures indicate whether the snake is preparing to flee, fight, or protect itself. Different biological factors such as body temperature and sex also influence whether the snake exhibits certain antipredatory behaviors.

The warmer the temperature of a garter snake, the more likely the snake is to flee a predator; a snake with a cooler body temperature is more likely to remain stationary or attack. Male garter snakes are also more likely to flee. Garter snakes that exhibit more aggressive antipredatory displays tend to also be fast and have high stamina. However, the reason for this correlation is unknown.

The first response of the snake to a predator is often a bluff. When the snake was teased with a finger under laboratory conditions, the snake reacted aggressively, but once touched, it became passive. This may be because the snake is disinclined to attack an organism it sees as larger than itself. Garter snakes do not exhibit mimicry or aposematic coloration; relying on cryptic coloration for protection, they will freeze until they know they are spotted, then attempt a stealthy departure.

The decision of a juvenile garter snake to attack a predator can be affected by whether the snake has just eaten or not. Snakes that have just eaten are more likely to strike a predator or stimulus than snakes that do not have a full stomach. Snakes that have just eaten a large animal are less mobile.

Another factor that controls the antipredatory response of the garter snake is where on its body the snake is attacked. Many birds and mammals prefer to attack the head of the snake. Garter snakes are more likely to hide their heads and move their tails back and forth when being attacked close to the head. Snakes that are attacked in the middles of their bodies are more likely to flee or exhibit open-mouthed warning reactions.

Age may be another factor that contributes to antipredatory responses. As garter snakes mature, the length of time for which they can engage in physical activity at 25 °C increases. Juvenile snakes can only be physically active for 3–5 minutes. Adult snakes can be physically active for up to 25 minutes. This is mostly due to aerobic energy production; pulmonary aeration increases up to three times in adult garter snakes when compared to juveniles. The quick fatigue of the juveniles limits the habitats they can live in, as well as their food sources. It also affects the antipredator response of both juvenile and adult garter snakes; without sufficient energy production, the snake cannot effect an antipredatory response.

See also
Narcisse Snake Dens

References

Bibliography
Beolens, Bo; Watkins, Michael; Grayson, Michael (2011). The Eponym Dictionary of Reptiles. Baltimore: Johns Hopkins University Press. xiii + 296 pp. .

External links

Care of Garter Snakes
Garter Snake Information
Caring for Your Garter Snake

.
Eastern Garter Snake at Ontario Nature.
Red-sided Garter Snake at Ontario Nature.

Further reading
Conant, Roger; Bridges, William (1939). What Snake Is That? A Field Guide to the Snakes of the United States East of the Rocky Mountains. (with 108 drawings by Edmond Malnate). New York and London: D. Appleton Century Company. Frontispiece map + viii + 163 pp. + Plates A-C, 1-32. (Thamnophis sirtalis, pp. 124–126 + Plate 24, figures 70–72).
Linnaeus C (1758). Systema naturæ per regna tria naturæ, secundum classes, ordines, genera, species, cum characteribus, differentiis, synonymis, locis. Tomus I. Editio Decima, Reformata. Stockholm: L. Salvius. 824 pp. (Coluber sirtalis, new species, p. 222). (in Latin).
Powell R, Conant R, Collins JT (2016). Peterson Field Guide to Reptiles and Amphibians of Eastern and Central North America, Fourth Edition. Boston and New York: Houghton Mifflin Harcourt. xiv + 494 pp., 47 plates, 207 figures. . (Thamnophis sirtalis, pp. 431–433 + Plate 43).
Schmidt, Karl P.; Davis, D. Dwight (1941). Field Book of Snakes of the United States and Canada. New York: G.P. Putnam's Sons. 365 pp., 34 plates, 103 figures. (Thamnophis sirtalis, pp. 252–255 + Plate 26).
Smith HM, Brodie ED Jr (1982). Reptiles of North America: A Guide to Field Identification. New York: Golden Press. 240 pp. . (Thamnophis sirtalis, pp. 148–149).
Stebbins RC (2003). A Field Guide to Western Reptiles and Amphibians, Third Edition. The Peterson Field Guide Series . Boston and New York: Houghton Mifflin. xiii + 533 pp., 56 plates. . (Thamnophis sirtalis, pp. 375–377 + Plate 48 + Map 162).
Wright, Albert Hazen; Wright, Anna Allen (1957). Handbook of Snakes of the United States and Canada. Ithaca and London: Comstock Publishing Associates, a division of Cornell University Press. 1,105 pp. (in 2 volumes). (Thamnophis sirtalis, pp. 834–863, Figures 242–248, Map 60).

Thamnophis
Snakes of North America
Reptiles of the United States
Reptiles of Ontario
Fauna of the Eastern United States
Fauna of the Great Lakes region (North America)
Fauna of the Great Plains
Fauna of the Plains-Midwest (United States)
Reptiles described in 1758
Taxa named by Carl Linnaeus
Pliocene reptiles of North America
Extant Zanclean first appearances